Cominelli is an Italian surname. Notable people with the surname include:

Andrea Cominelli, 17th-century Italian stonemason, sculptor, and architect
Lucas Cominelli (born 1976), Argentine footballer
Severo Cominelli (born 1915), Italian footballer

Italian-language surnames